Mark Clintberg is a Canadian contemporary artist working in the domain of Art History. He is an Associate Professor in the School of Critical and Creative Studies at the Alberta University of the Arts. He graduated from Concordia University with a PhD in Art History in 2013 where his  dissertation was nominated for the Governor-General's Gold Academic Medal.

His work is included in the collections of the  National Gallery of Canada and the Alberta Foundation for the Arts. In 2013, he was shortlisted for the Sobey Art Awards. His work is represented by the Pierre François Ouellette art contemporain gallery in Montreal, Quebec.

References

External links 

 Artists website https://cargocollective.com/markclintbergcom/

21st-century Canadian artists
Concordia University alumni
Year of birth missing (living people)
Living people